Finan is a surname. Notable people with the name include:
 Bobby Finan  (1912–1983), Scottish professional football player
 Joe Finan (1927–2006), American popular radio show host 
 John Finan (1898–1984), Irish Clann na Talmhan politician
 W. Timothy Finan (born 1950), American politician and jurist

See also
 Finan of Lindisfarne (died 661), or Saint Finan, Irish monk
 Finnan (disambiguation)

fr:Finan